Perkins Creek is a stream in Bollinger County in the U.S. state of Missouri.

Perkins Creek has the name of Peter Perkins, an early citizen.

See also
List of rivers of Missouri

References

Rivers of Bollinger County, Missouri
Rivers of Missouri